Latino or Latinos refers to:

 Latino (demonym), a term used in the United States for people with cultural ties to Latin America
 Hispanic and Latino Americans in the United States
 The people or cultures of Latin America;
 Latin Americans

Latino and Latinos may also refer to:

Language and linguistics
 il latino or la lingua latina, Italian names for Latin
 alfabeto latino, Italian name for the Latin alphabet
 Latino sine flexione, a constructed language
 The native name of the Mozarabic language
 A historical name for the Judeo-Italian languages

Media and entertainment

Music
Latino (Sebastian Santa Maria album)
Latino, album by Milos Karadaglic
"Latino", winning song from Spain in the OTI Festival, 1981

Other media
Latino (film), from 1985
Latinos (newspaper series)

People

Given name
Latino Galasso, Italian rower
Latino Latini, Italian scholar and humanist of the Renaissance
Latino Malabranca Orsini, Italian cardinal
Latino Orsini, Italian cardinal

Other names
Joseph Nunzio Latino, Italian American Roman Catholic bishop
Latino (singer), Brazilian singer

Other uses
Latino (grape), an Italian wine grape
Mascalzone Latino, an Italian yacht racing team

See also
 Hispanic
 Ladino (disambiguation)
 Latin (disambiguation)
 Latina (disambiguation)
 Latini (surname)